Sonama (Nepali: सोनमा) is a rural municipality in Mahottari District in Madhesh province of Nepal. It was formed in 2016 occupying current 8 sections (wards) from previous 8 former VDCs. It occupies an area of 57.77 km2 with a total population of 51732.

References 

Populated places in Mahottari District
Rural municipalities of Nepal established in 2017
Rural municipalities in Madhesh Province